Football is among the most popular sports in Japan, together with baseball, basketball, sumo and martial arts. Its nationwide organization, the Japan Football Association, administers the professional football leagues, including J.League, which is considered by many the most successful football league in Asia.

Football
Although the official English name of the Japan Football Association uses the term "football", the term sakkā (サッカー), derived from "soccer", is much more commonly used than futtobōru (フットボール). The JFA's Japanese name is Nippon Sakkā Kyōkai.

Before World War II the term in general use was shūkyū (蹴球, kick-ball), a Sino-Japanese term. With previously exclusive Japanese terms replaced by American influence after the war, sakkā became more commonplace. In recent years, many professional teams have named themselves F.C.s (football clubs), with examples being FC Tokyo and Kyoto Sanga FC.

History
The introduction of football in Japan is officially credited by the Japan Football Association, and numerous academic papers and books on the history of association football in Japan, to then Lieutenant-Commander Archibald Lucius Douglas of the Royal Navy and his subordinates, who from 1873 taught the game and its rules to Japanese navy cadets while acting as instructors at the Imperial Japanese Navy Academy in Tsukiji, Tokyo.

The first official football match in Japan is widely believed to have been held on February 18, 1888, between the Yokohama Country & Athletic Club and Kobe Regatta & Athletic Club. YC&AC is the oldest running association football club in Japan as Association Football was introduced into the club on December 25, 1886, for training sessions starting from January 1887.
The first Japanese association football club, founded as a football club, is considered to be Tokyo Shukyu-dan, founded in 1917, which is now competing in the Tokyo Prefectural amateur league.

In the 1920s, football associations were organised and regional tournaments began in universities and high schools especially in Tokyo. In 1930, the Japan national association football team was organised and had a 3–3 tie with China for their first title at the Far Eastern Championship Games. The Japan national team also participated in the 1936 Berlin Olympic Games, the team had the first victory in an Olympic game with a 3–2 win over powerful Sweden.

Aside from the national cup, the Emperor's Cup established in 1921, there had been several attempts at creating a senior-level national championship. The first was the All Japan Works Football Championship (AJWFC), established in 1948 and open only to company teams. The second was the All Japan Inter-City Football Championship (AJICFC), established in 1955 and separating clubs by cities (any club, works, university or autonomous, could represent their home city and qualify) but the Emperor's Cup remained dominated by universities until the late 1950s. All these tournaments were cups following single-elimination formulas, similar to Serie A in Italy before 1929.

The first organized national league, the Japan Soccer League, was organized in 1965 with eight amateur company clubs and replaced the AJWFC and AJICFC. At the 1968 Mexico Olympic Games, the Japan national team, filled with the top JSL stars of the era, had its first big success winning third place and a bronze medal. Olympic success spurred the creation of a Second Division for the JSL and openings for the first few professional players, in the beginning, foreigners (mainly Brazilians), and a few from other countries, which also led to the country hosting its first international competition, the 1979 FIFA World Youth Championship. Japanese players, however, remained an amateur, having to work day jobs for the companies owning the clubs (or other companies if their clubs were autonomous). This limited the growth of the Japanese game, and many better Japanese players had to move abroad to make a living off the game, such as Yasuhiko Okudera, the first Japanese player to play in a professional European club, (1. FC Köln of Germany). UEFA and CONMEBOL aided the Japanese awareness of football by having the Intercontinental Cup played in Tokyo as a neutral venue.

In 1993, the Japan Professional Football League (commonly known as the J.League) was formed replacing the semi-professional Japan Soccer League as the new top-level club competition in Japan. It consisted of some of the top clubs from the old JSL, fully professionalized, renamed to fit communities and with the corporate identity reduced to a minimum. The new higher-standard league attracted many more spectators and helped the sport to hugely increase in popularity. The professionalized league also offered, and offers, incentives for amateur non-company clubs to become part of their ranks with no major backing from a company; major examples of community, non-company-affiliated clubs who rose through the prefectural and regional ranks into the major leagues are Albirex Niigata and Oita Trinita.

Japan participated in its first-ever World Cup tournament at the 1998 FIFA World Cup held in France. In 2002, Japan co-hosted the 2002 FIFA World Cup with Republic of Korea. After this, the association football communities of both countries received the FIFA Fair Play Award. The Japanese national team has reached the round of 16 on four occasions – as hosts in 2002, where they were knocked out by Turkey 1–0, in 2010, where they lost to Paraguay in penalties, in 2018 where they fell 2–3 to Belgium, and in the 2022 FIFA World Cup. Japan also qualified for the 2006 FIFA World Cup in Germany, the 2010 FIFA World Cup in South Africa and the 2014 FIFA World Cup in Brazil.

Football in fiction
The first worldwide popular association football-oriented Japanese animation (manga) series, Captain Tsubasa, was started in 1981. Captain Tsubasa was extremely popular among children of both genders in Japan. Its success led to much more association football manga being written, and it played a great role in association football history in Japan. Playing football became more popular than playing baseball in many schools throughout Japan from the 1980s due to the series.

Captain Tsubasa has also inspired the likes of prominent footballers such as Hidetoshi Nakata, Seigo Narazaki, Zinedine Zidane, Francesco Totti, Fernando Torres, Christian Vieri, Giuseppe Sculli, James Rodríguez, Alexis Sánchez and Alessandro Del Piero to play association football and choose it as a career.  The inspiration for the character of Tsubasa Oozora came from a number of players, including most prominently Musashi Mizushima, arguably the first Japanese footballer to play abroad, and whose move to São Paulo FC as a ten-year-old boy was partly mimicked in the manga.

The anime Giant Killing revolves around a team's efforts to go from one of the worst professional teams in Japan to the best. Other works focusing on football include Hungry Heart: Wild Striker (from the same author of Captain Tsubasa), The Knight in the Area, Days, Inazuma Eleven and Blue Lock.

Women's football

As in Europe's advanced countries, Japanese women's football is organized on a promotion and relegation basis. The top flight of women's association football is the semi-professional L. League (currently billed as the Nadeshiko League). Most clubs are independent clubs, although the recent trend is to have women's sections of established J.League clubs.

The national team has enjoyed major success at the FIFA Women's World Cup, having achieved its greatest triumph ever by winning the 2011 FIFA Women's World Cup in Germany and finishing as runner-up in 2015 in Canada.

Small-sided football

Championships and tournaments

Domestic tournaments 
 J.League (Japan Professional Football League) is the top national league in Japan with a J1, J2 and J3 League.
 Japan Football League (JFL) is the national amateur league.
 Emperor's Cup (since 1921) the national open cup.
 J.League Cup is the cup restricted to J.League members (usually J1 alone).
 All Japan Adults Football Tournament, cup for clubs in regional leagues below JFL.
 Japan Regional Football Champions League, round-robin elimination tournament for the promotion of regional-league clubs into JFL.

Other international tournaments held in Japan 
 1958 3rd Asian Games, Tokyo
 1964 Tokyo Olympic Games
 1979 FIFA World Youth Championship
 1992 AFC Asian Cup, Hiroshima
 1993 FIFA U-17 World Championship
 1994 12th Asian Games, Hiroshima
 1998 Dynasty Cup, Tokyo & Yokohama Dynasty Cup
 2001 FIFA Confederations Cup (joint with South Korea)
 2002 FIFA World Cup (joint with South Korea)
 Intercontinental Cup / Toyota European/South American Cup (1981–2004)
 2005–2008, 2011–2012, 2015–2016 FIFA Club World Cup
 2020 Tokyo Olympic Games

Japanese footballers 
 Kunishige Kamamoto (1944– ), Top scorer in 1968 Summer Olympics.
 Yasuhiko Okudera (1952– ), first Japanese player in the European League (Bundesliga).
 Masami Ihara (1967– ), Asian Footballer of the Year in 1995
 Masashi Nakayama (1967– ), first Japanese player to score a goal in a FIFA World Cup
 Hidetoshi Nakata (1977– ), Asian Footballer of the Year in 1997 and 1998
 Shunsuke Nakamura (1978–), Scottish Professional Footballers' Association Player of the Year in 2007
 Homare Sawa (1978–), FIFA Women's World Player of the Year in 2011 and one of only two players of either sex to participate in six World Cup final tournaments
 Shinji Ono (1979– ), Asian Footballer of the Year in 2002
 Yasuhito Endō (1980– ), Most capped (152) player

See also :Category:Japanese footballers.

Men's national team achievements 
 1968 Mexico Olympic Games – Bronze Medal
 1992 2nd Dynasty Cup 1992 – Champions
 1992 10th Asian Cup – Champions
 1993 5th Afro-Asian Nations Cup – Champions
 1995 3rd Dynasty Cup – Champions
 1998 4th Dynasty Cup – Champions
 1999 FIFA World Youth Championship – Silver Medal
 2000 12th Asian Cup – Champions
 2001 FIFA Confederations Cup – Silver Medal
 2002 FIFA World Cup – Round of 16
 2004 13th Asian Cup – Champions
 2006 FIFA World Cup – Group Stage
 2007 14th Asian Cup – Semi-final
 2010 FIFA World Cup – Round of 16
 2011 15th Asian Cup – Champions
 2014 FIFA World Cup – Group Stage
 2015 16th Asian Cup – Quarter Final
 2018 FIFA World Cup – Round of 16
 2019 17th Asian Cup – Runners-up
 2022 FIFA World Cup – Round of 16

Women's national team achievements 
 1986 AFC Women's Championship – Runners-up
 1989 AFC Women's Championship – Third place
 1990 Asian Games – Silver Medal
 1991 AFC Women's Championship – Runners-up
 1993 AFC Women's Championship – Third place
 1994 Asian Games – Silver Medal
 1995 FIFA Women's World Cup – Quarter-finals
 1995 AFC Women's Championship – Runners-up
 1997 AFC Women's Championship – Third place
 1998 Asian Games – Bronze Medal
 2001 AFC Women's Championship – Runners-up
 2002 Asian Games – Bronze Medal
 2006 Asian Games – Silver Medal
 2008 AFC Women's Asian Cup – Third place
 2010 AFC Women's Asian Cup – Third place
 2010 Asian Games – Gold Medal
 2011 FIFA Women's World Cup – Champions
 2012 London Olympic Games – Silver Medal
 2014 AFC Women's Asian Cup – Champions
 2015 FIFA Women's World Cup – Runners-up
 2018 AFC Women's Asian Cup – Champions
 2019 FIFA Women's World Cup – Round 16
 2020 Tokyo Olympic Games – Quarter Final
 2022 AFC Women's Asian Cup – Semi-final

Seasons in Japanese association football

+50,000 capacity football stadiums in Japan

See also

 Sport in Japan
 Football in Japan
 Women's football in Japan
 Japan Football Association (JFA)
 Japanese association football league system
 League system
 J.League
 J1 League (I)
 J2 League (II)
 J3 League (III)
 Japan Football League (JFL) (IV)
 Japan Regional Football Champions League (Promotion Play-offs to JFL)
 Japanese Regional Leagues (V/VI)
 Fuji Xerox Super Cup (Super Cup)
 Emperor's Cup (National Cup)
 J.League YBC Levain Cup (League Cup)
List of Japanese football competitions (in Japanese)

References

External links
 Japan Football Association (JFA) – official website 
 Competitions - JFA official website
 FOOTBALL-1 International Football Business Exhibition (English version)
 Hongo, Jun, "SOCCER IN JAPAN:  Japan team has foot in World Cup door but can it kick?", Japan Times, February 9, 2010, p. 3.